Bontemorgen is a hamlet in the Dutch province of Gelderland. It is a part of the municipality of Buren, and lies about 7 km south of Veenendaal.

Bontemorgen is not a statistical entity, and the postal authorities have placed it under Lienden. It was first mentioned in 1913 as Bontemorgen. Bonte is a references to cows, and morgen is an old land measurement. It consists of about 20 houses.

References

Populated places in Gelderland
Buren